In formal language theory, a context-free grammar (CFG) is a formal grammar whose production rules 
can be applied to a nonterminal symbol regardless of its context.
In particular, in a context-free grammar, each production rule is of the form

with  a single nonterminal symbol, and  a string of terminals and/or nonterminals ( can be empty).

A formal grammar is essentially a set of production rules that describe all possible strings in a given formal language. Production rules are simple replacements. For example, the first rule in the picture,

There can be multiple replacement rules for a given nonterminal symbol. The language generated by a grammar is the set of all strings of terminal symbols that can be derived, by repeated rule applications, from some particular nonterminal symbol ("start symbol").
Nonterminal symbols are used during the derivation process, but do not appear in its final result string.

Languages generated by context-free grammars are known as context-free languages (CFL). Different context-free grammars can generate the same context-free language. It is important to distinguish the properties of the language (intrinsic properties) from the properties of a particular grammar (extrinsic properties). The language equality question (do two given context-free grammars generate the same language?) is undecidable.

Context-free grammars arise in linguistics where they are used to describe the structure of sentences and words in a natural language, and they were invented by the linguist Noam Chomsky for this purpose. By contrast, in computer science, as the use of recursively-defined concepts increased, they were used more and more. In an early application, grammars are used to describe the structure of programming languages. In a newer application, they are used in an essential part of the Extensible Markup Language (XML) called the Document Type Definition.

In linguistics, some authors use the term phrase structure grammar to refer to context-free grammars, whereby phrase-structure grammars are distinct from dependency grammars. In computer science, a popular notation for context-free grammars is Backus–Naur form, or BNF.

Background 

Since at least the time of the ancient Indian scholar Pāṇini, linguists have described the grammars of languages in terms of their block structure, and described how sentences are recursively built up from smaller phrases, and eventually individual words or word elements. An essential property of these block structures is that logical units never overlap. For example, the sentence:
 John, whose blue car was in the garage, walked to the grocery store.
can be logically parenthesized (with the logical metasymbols [ ]) as follows:
 [John[, [whose [blue car]] [was [in [the garage]]],]] [walked [to [the [grocery store]]]].
A context-free grammar provides a simple and mathematically precise mechanism for describing the methods by which phrases in some natural language are built from smaller blocks, capturing the "block structure" of sentences in a natural way. Its simplicity makes the formalism amenable to rigorous mathematical study. Important features of natural language syntax such as agreement and reference are not part of the context-free grammar, but the basic recursive structure of sentences, the way in which clauses nest inside other clauses, and the way in which lists of adjectives and adverbs are swallowed by nouns and verbs, is described exactly.

Context-free grammars are a special form of Semi-Thue systems that in their general form date back to the work of Axel Thue.

The formalism of context-free grammars was developed in the mid-1950s by Noam Chomsky, and also their classification as a special type of formal grammar (which he called phrase-structure grammars). Some authors, however, reserve the term for more restricted grammars in the Chomsky hierarchy: context-sensitive grammars or context-free grammars. In a broader sense, phrase structure grammars are also known as constituency grammars. The defining trait of phrase structure grammars is thus their adherence to the constituency relation, as opposed to the dependency relation of dependency grammars. In Chomsky's generative grammar framework, the syntax of natural language was described by context-free rules combined with transformation rules.

Block structure was introduced into computer programming languages by the Algol project (1957–1960), which, as a consequence, also featured a context-free grammar to describe the resulting Algol syntax. This became a standard feature of computer languages, and the notation for grammars used in concrete descriptions of computer languages came to be known as Backus–Naur form, after two members of the Algol language design committee. The "block structure" aspect that context-free grammars capture is so fundamental to grammar that the terms syntax and grammar are often identified with context-free grammar rules, especially in computer science. Formal constraints not captured by the grammar are then considered to be part of the "semantics" of the language.

Context-free grammars are simple enough to allow the construction of efficient parsing algorithms that, for a given string, determine whether and how it can be generated from the grammar. An Earley parser is an example of such an algorithm, while the widely used LR and LL parsers are simpler algorithms that deal only with more restrictive subsets of context-free grammars.

Formal definitions 
A context-free grammar  is defined by the 4-tuple , 
where
  is a finite set; each element  is called a nonterminal character or a variable. Each variable represents a different type of phrase or clause in the sentence. Variables are also sometimes called syntactic categories.
The set of terminals is the alphabet of the language defined by the grammar .
(also commonly symbolized by a )
  is the start variable (or start symbol), used to represent the whole sentence (or program).

Production rule notation 
.

The form  is called an -production.

It is common to list all right-hand sides for the same left-hand side on the same line, using | (the vertical bar) to separate them.

Rule application 

Repetitive rule application 
If , the relation  holds.

Context-free language 
The language of a grammar  is the set

of all terminal-symbol strings derivable from the start symbol.

A language  is said to be a context-free language (CFL), if there exists a CFG , such that .

Non-deterministic pushdown automata recognize exactly the context-free languages.

Examples

Words concatenated with their reverse 

The grammar , with productions

,
,
,

is context-free. It is not proper since it includes an ε-production. A typical derivation in this grammar is
.
This makes it clear that 
. 
The language is context-free, however, it can be proved that it is not regular.

If the productions

,
,

are added, a context-free grammar for the set of all palindromes over the alphabet  is obtained.

Well-formed parentheses 
The canonical example of a context-free grammar is parenthesis matching, which is representative of the general case. There are two terminal symbols "(" and ")" and one nonterminal symbol S. The production rules are

,
,

The first rule allows the S symbol to multiply; the second rule allows the S symbol to become enclosed by matching parentheses; and the third rule terminates the recursion.

Well-formed nested parentheses and square brackets 

A second canonical example is two different kinds of matching nested parentheses, described by the productions:

with terminal symbols [ ] and nonterminal S.

The following sequence can be derived in that grammar:

Matching pairs 
In a context-free grammar, we can pair up characters the way we do with brackets. The simplest example:

This grammar generates the language , which is not regular (according to the pumping lemma for regular languages).

The special character ε stands for the empty string. By changing the above grammar to

we obtain a grammar generating the language  instead. This differs only in that it contains the empty string while the original grammar did not.

Distinct number of a's and b's 

A context-free grammar for the language consisting of all strings over {a,b} containing an unequal number of a's and b's:

Here, the nonterminal T can generate all strings with more a's than b's, the nonterminal U generates all strings with more b's than a's and the nonterminal V generates all strings with an equal number of a's and b's. Omitting the third alternative in the rules for T and U doesn't restrict the grammar's language.

Second block of b's of double size 

It is context-free as it can be generated by the following context-free grammar:

First-order logic formulas 

The formation rules for the terms and formulas of formal logic fit the definition of context-free grammar, except that the set of symbols may be infinite and there may be more than one start symbol.

Examples of languages that are not context free 

In contrast to well-formed nested parentheses and square brackets in the previous section, there is no context-free grammar for generating all sequences of two different types of parentheses, each separately balanced disregarding the other, where the two types need not nest inside one another, for example:

or

The fact that this language is not context free can be proven using pumping lemma for context-free languages and a proof by contradiction, observing that all words of the form 

should belong to the language. This language belongs instead to a more general class and can be described by a conjunctive grammar, which in turn also includes other non-context-free languages, such as the language of all words of the form
.

Regular grammars 

Every regular grammar is context-free, but not all context-free grammars are regular. The following context-free grammar, for example, is also regular.

This grammar is regular: no rule has more than one nonterminal in its right-hand side, and each of these nonterminals is at the same end of the right-hand side.

Every regular grammar corresponds directly to a nondeterministic finite automaton, so we know that this is a regular language.

Using vertical bars, the grammar above can be described more tersely as follows:

Derivations and syntax trees 

A derivation of a string for a grammar is a sequence of grammar rule applications that transform the start symbol into the string.
A derivation proves that the string belongs to the grammar's language.

A derivation is fully determined by giving, for each step:
 the rule applied in that step
 the occurrence of its left-hand side to which it is applied
For clarity, the intermediate string is usually given as well.

For instance, with the grammar:

 
 
 

the string

can be derived from the start symbol  with the following derivation:

 (by rule 1. on )
 (by rule 1. on the second )
 (by rule 2. on the first )
 (by rule 2. on the second )
 (by rule 3. on the third )

Often, a strategy is followed that deterministically chooses the next nonterminal to rewrite:

 in a leftmost derivation, it is always the leftmost nonterminal;
 in a rightmost derivation, it is always the rightmost nonterminal.

Given such a strategy, a derivation is completely determined by the sequence of rules applied. For instance, one leftmost derivation of the same string is

 (by rule 1 on the leftmost )
 (by rule 2 on the leftmost )
 (by rule 1 on the leftmost )
 (by rule 2 on the leftmost )
 (by rule 3 on the leftmost ),

which can be summarized as

rule 1
rule 2
rule 1
rule 2
rule 3.

One rightmost derivation is:

 (by rule 1 on the rightmost )
 (by rule 1 on the rightmost )
 (by rule 3 on the rightmost )
 (by rule 2 on the rightmost )
 (by rule 2 on the rightmost ),

which can be summarized as

rule 1
rule 1
rule 3
rule 2
rule 2.

The distinction between leftmost derivation and rightmost derivation is important because in most parsers the transformation of the input is defined by giving a piece of code for every grammar rule that is executed whenever the rule is applied. Therefore, it is important to know whether the parser determines a leftmost or a rightmost derivation because this determines the order in which the pieces of code will be executed. See for an example LL parsers and LR parsers.

A derivation also imposes in some sense a hierarchical structure on the string that is derived. For example, if the string "1 + 1 + a" is derived according to the leftmost derivation outlined above, the structure of the string would be:

This hierarchy can also be seen as a tree:

This tree is called a parse tree or "concrete syntax tree" of the string, by contrast with the abstract syntax tree. In this case the presented leftmost and the rightmost derivations define the same parse tree; however, there is another rightmost derivation of the same string

 (by rule 1 on the rightmost )
 (by rule 3 on the rightmost )
 (by rule 1 on the rightmost )
 (by rule 2 on the rightmost )
 (by rule 2 on the rightmost ),

which defines a string with a different structure

and a different parse tree:

Note however that both parse trees can be obtained by both leftmost and rightmost derivations.  For example, the last tree can be obtained with the leftmost derivation as follows:

 (by rule 1 on the leftmost )
 (by rule 1 on the leftmost )
 (by rule 2 on the leftmost )
 (by rule 2 on the leftmost )
 (by rule 3 on the leftmost ),

If a string in the language of the grammar has more than one parsing tree, then the grammar is said to be an ambiguous grammar. Such grammars are usually hard to parse because the parser cannot always decide which grammar rule it has to apply. Usually, ambiguity is a feature of the grammar, not the language, and an unambiguous grammar can be found that generates the same context-free language. However, there are certain languages that can only be generated by ambiguous grammars; such languages are called inherently ambiguous languages.

Example: Algebraic expressions 
Here is a context-free grammar for syntactically correct infix algebraic expressions in the variables x, y and z:

This grammar can, for example, generate the string

as follows:

 (by rule 5)
 (by rule 6, applied to the leftmost )
 (by rule 7, applied to the rightmost )
 (by rule 8, applied to the leftmost )
 (by rule 8, applied to the rightmost )
 (by rule 4, applied to the leftmost )
 (by rule 6, applied to the fourth )
 (by rule 4, applied to the rightmost )
 (etc.)

Note that many choices were made underway as to which rewrite was going to be performed next.
These choices look quite arbitrary. As a matter of fact, they are, in the sense that the string finally generated is always the same.  For example, the second and third rewrites

 (by rule 6, applied to the leftmost )
 (by rule 7, applied to the rightmost )

could be done in the opposite order:

 (by rule 7, applied to the rightmost )
 (by rule 6, applied to the leftmost )

Also, many choices were made on which rule to apply to each selected .
Changing the choices made and not only the order they were made in usually affects which terminal string comes out at the end.

Let's look at this in more detail. Consider the parse tree of this derivation:

Starting at the top, step by step, an S in the tree is expanded, until no more unexpanded es (nonterminals) remain.
Picking a different order of expansion will produce a different derivation, but the same parse tree.
The parse tree will only change if we pick a different rule to apply at some position in the tree.

But can a different parse tree still produce the same terminal string,
Yes, for this particular grammar, this is possible.
Grammars with this property are called ambiguous.

For example,  can be produced with these two different parse trees:

However, the language described by this grammar is not inherently ambiguous:
an alternative, unambiguous grammar can be given for the language, for example:

,

once again picking  as the start symbol. This alternative grammar will produce  with a parse tree similar to the left one above, i.e. implicitly assuming the association , which does not follow standard order of operations. More elaborate, unambiguous and context-free grammars can be constructed that produce parse trees that obey all desired operator precedence and associativity rules.

Normal forms 
Every context-free grammar with no ε-production has an equivalent grammar in Chomsky normal form, and a grammar in Greibach normal form. "Equivalent" here means that the two grammars generate the same language.

The especially simple form of production rules in Chomsky normal form grammars has both theoretical and practical implications. For instance, given a context-free grammar, one can use the Chomsky normal form to construct a polynomial-time algorithm that decides whether a given string is in the language represented by that grammar or not (the CYK algorithm).

Closure properties
Context-free languages are closed under the various operations, that is, if the languages K and L are 
context-free, so is the result of the following operations:

 union K ∪ L; concatenation K ∘ L; Kleene star L*
 substitution (in particular homomorphism)
 inverse homomorphism
 intersection with a regular language

They are not closed under general intersection (hence neither under complementation) and set difference.

Decidable problems 

The following are some decidable problems about context-free grammars.

Parsing 

The parsing problem, checking whether a given word belongs to the language given by a context-free grammar, is decidable, using one of the general-purpose parsing algorithms:
 CYK algorithm (for grammars in Chomsky normal form)
 Earley parser
 GLR parser
 LL parser (only for the proper subclass of for LL(k) grammars)
Context-free parsing for Chomsky normal form grammars was shown by Leslie G. Valiant to be reducible to boolean matrix multiplication, thus inheriting its complexity upper bound of O(n2.3728639). Conversely, Lillian Lee has shown O(n3−ε) boolean matrix multiplication to be reducible to O(n3−3ε) CFG parsing, thus establishing some kind of lower bound for the latter.

Reachability, productiveness, nullability 

A nonterminal symbol  is called productive, or generating, if there is a derivation  for some string  of terminal symbols.  is called reachable if there is a derivation  for some strings  of nonterminal and terminal symbols from the start symbol.  is called useless if it is unreachable or unproductive.  is called nullable if there is a derivation . A rule  is called an ε-production. A derivation  is called a cycle.

Algorithms are known to eliminate from a given grammar, without changing its generated language,
 unproductive symbols,
 unreachable symbols,
 ε-productions, with one possible exception, and
 cycles.

In particular, an alternative containing a useless nonterminal symbol can be deleted from the right-hand side of a rule.
Such rules and alternatives are called useless.

In the depicted example grammar, the nonterminal D is unreachable, and E is unproductive, while C → C causes a cycle.
Hence, omitting the last three rules doesn't change the language generated by the grammar, nor does omitting the alternatives "| Cc | Ee" from the right-hand side of the rule for S.

A context-free grammar is said to be proper if it has neither useless symbols nor ε-productions nor cycles. 
Combining the above algorithms, every context-free grammar not generating ε can be transformed into a weakly equivalent proper one.

Regularity and LL(k) checks 

It is decidable whether a given grammar is a regular grammar, as well as whether it is an LL(k) grammar for a given k≥0. If k is not given, the latter problem is undecidable.

Given a context-free language, it is neither decidable whether it is regular, nor whether it is an LL(k) language for a given k.

Emptiness and finiteness 

There are algorithms to decide whether a language of a given context-free language is empty, as well as whether it is finite.

Undecidable problems 
Some questions that are undecidable for wider classes of grammars become decidable for context-free grammars; e.g. the emptiness problem (whether the grammar generates any terminal strings at all), is undecidable for context-sensitive grammars, but decidable for context-free grammars.

However, many problems are undecidable even for context-free grammars. Examples are:

Universality 
Given a CFG, does it generate the language of all strings over the alphabet of terminal symbols used in its rules?

A reduction can be demonstrated to this problem from the well-known undecidable problem of determining whether a Turing machine accepts a particular input (the halting problem). The reduction uses the concept of a computation history, a string describing an entire computation of a Turing machine. A CFG can be constructed that generates all strings that are not accepting computation histories for a particular Turing machine on a particular input, and thus it will accept all strings only if the machine doesn't accept that input.

Language equality 
Given two CFGs, do they generate the same language?

The undecidability of this problem is a direct consequence of the previous: it is impossible to even decide whether a CFG is equivalent to the trivial CFG defining the language of all strings.

Language inclusion 
Given two CFGs, can the first one generate all strings that the second one can generate?

If this problem was decidable, then language equality could be decided too: two CFGs G1 and G2 generate the same language if L(G1) is a subset of L(G2) and L(G2) is a subset of L(G1).

Being in a lower or higher level of the Chomsky hierarchy 
Using Greibach's theorem, it can be shown that the two following problems are undecidable:

 Given a context-sensitive grammar, does it describe a context-free language?
 Given a context-free grammar, does it describe a regular language?

Grammar ambiguity 
Given a CFG, is it ambiguous?

The undecidability of this problem follows from the fact that if an algorithm to determine ambiguity existed, the Post correspondence problem could be decided, which is known to be undecidable. This may be proved by Ogden's lemma.

Language disjointness 
Given two CFGs, is there any string derivable from both grammars?

If this problem was decidable, the undecidable Post correspondence problem could be decided, too: given strings  over some alphabet , let the grammar  consist of the rule
;
;
Then the Post problem given by  has a solution if and only if  and  share a derivable string.

Extensions 
An obvious way to extend the context-free grammar formalism is to allow nonterminals to have arguments, the values of which are passed along within the rules. This allows natural language features such as agreement and reference, and programming language analogs such as the correct use and definition of identifiers, to be expressed in a natural way. E.g. we can now easily express that in English sentences, the subject and verb must agree in number. In computer science, examples of this approach include affix grammars, attribute grammars, indexed grammars, and Van Wijngaarden two-level grammars. Similar extensions exist in linguistics.

An extended context-free grammar (or regular right part grammar) is one in which the right-hand side of the production rules is allowed to be a regular expression over the grammar's terminals and nonterminals. Extended context-free grammars describe exactly the context-free languages.

Another extension is to allow additional terminal symbols to appear at the left-hand side of rules, constraining their application. This produces the formalism of context-sensitive grammars.

Subclasses 
There are a number of important subclasses of the context-free grammars:

 LR(k) grammars (also known as deterministic context-free grammars) allow parsing (string recognition) with deterministic pushdown automata (PDA), but they can only describe deterministic context-free languages.
 Simple LR, Look-Ahead LR grammars are subclasses that allow further simplification of parsing. SLR and LALR are recognized using the same PDA as LR, but with simpler tables, in most cases.
 LL(k) and LL(*) grammars allow parsing by direct construction of a leftmost derivation as described above, and describe even fewer languages.
 Simple grammars are a subclass of the LL(1) grammars mostly interesting for its theoretical property that language equality of simple grammars is decidable, while language inclusion is not.
 Bracketed grammars have the property that the terminal symbols are divided into left and right bracket pairs that always match up in rules.
 Linear grammars have no rules with more than one nonterminal on the right-hand side.
 Regular grammars are a subclass of the linear grammars and describe the regular languages, i.e. they correspond to finite automata and regular expressions.

LR parsing extends LL parsing to support a larger range of grammars; in turn, generalized LR parsing extends LR parsing to support arbitrary context-free grammars.  On LL grammars and LR grammars, it essentially performs LL parsing and LR parsing, respectively, while on nondeterministic grammars, it is as efficient as can be expected.  Although GLR parsing was developed in the 1980s, many new language definitions and parser generators continue to be based on LL, LALR or LR parsing up to the present day.

Linguistic applications 
Chomsky initially hoped to overcome the limitations of context-free grammars by adding transformation rules.

Such rules are another standard device in traditional linguistics; e.g. passivization in English. Much of generative grammar has been devoted to finding ways of refining the descriptive mechanisms of phrase-structure grammar and transformation rules such that exactly the kinds of things can be expressed that natural language actually allows. Allowing arbitrary transformations does not meet that goal: they are much too powerful, being Turing complete unless significant restrictions are added (e.g. no transformations that introduce and then rewrite symbols in a context-free fashion).

Chomsky's general position regarding the non-context-freeness of natural language has held up since then, although his specific examples regarding the inadequacy of context-free grammars in terms of their weak generative capacity were later disproved.
Gerald Gazdar and Geoffrey Pullum have argued that despite a few non-context-free constructions in natural language (such as cross-serial dependencies in Swiss German and reduplication in Bambara), the vast majority of forms in natural language are indeed context-free.

See also 
 Parsing expression grammar
 Stochastic context-free grammar
 Algorithms for context-free grammar generation
 Pumping lemma for context-free languages

References

Notes

Further reading 
. Chapter 4: Context-Free Grammars, pp. 77–106; Chapter 6: Properties of Context-Free Languages, pp. 125–137.
  
. Chapter 2: Context-Free Grammars, pp. 91–122; Section 4.1.2: Decidable problems concerning context-free languages, pp. 156–159; Section 5.1.1: Reductions via computation histories: pp. 176–183.

External links 
 Computer programmers may find the stack exchange answer to be useful.
 CFG Developer created by Christopher Wong at Stanford University in 2014; modified by Kevin Gibbons in 2015.

1956 in computing
Compiler construction
Formal languages
Programming language topics
Wikipedia articles with ASCII art